General elections were held in the British Virgin Islands on 12 November 1979.  The result was a victory for the opposition Virgin Islands Party (VIP) led by former Chief Minister Lavity Stoutt over the incumbent United Party (UP) led by Willard Wheatley. The newly formed Virgin Islands National Movement (VINM), led by Elvin Stoutt, also contested the elections but did not win any seats.

The supervisor of elections was Trevor A.F. Peters. Voter turnout was 74.8%.

The 1979 general election was the first election to be conducted after the Legislature had been expanded from seven to nine elected seats.  Three of the nine seats were not contested, with only a single candidate standing in the 3rd, 7th and 8th Districts. For the 3rd District, this was the second consecutive general election where the seat was uncontested.

The Virgin Islands Party won the election despite receiving only 733 votes in aggregate across all seats, and just 27.8% of the vote.  This low figure was in part was caused by the high number of uncontested seats, but also reflected significant voter disenchantment with the political process.

Background
By 1979 internal fighting had severely limited the capability of almost every political party in the British Virgin Islands.  After internal fighting, the VI Democratic Party (VIDP) was left with just one candidate: its founder, Q.W. Osborne.  The United Party fared little better: it was able to field two candidates.  Neither party would win a contested seat, although Willard Wheatley would win the 7th District by default for the United Party as he was unopposed.  The newly created Virgin Islands National Movement fielded the second most candidates with three, and even the Virgin Islands Party could only muster four.

Results
The Virgin Islands Party won all four of the seats it contested. Still short of being able to form a government, they moved to secure the loyalty of Oliver Cills (who had previously been a member of the VI Democratic Party), giving them a majority with which to form a government.

The victory of the Virgin Islands Party with just 733 votes and a 27.8% share of the vote are both record lows for a general election in the British Virgin Islands.

Candidates who were elected for the first time included future Chief Minister, Cyril Romney, and future Minister, Omar Hodge, who would hold his seat for the next 32 years (the third longest such span in British Virgin Islands politics).

The defeat of Q.W. Osborne in the 5th District signalled the end of the VI Democratic Party. Following the elections, the United Party was the only party left in existence from the 1967 general election.

By constituency

Footnotes

Elections in the British Virgin Islands
British Virgin
General election
November 1979 events in North America
British Virgin